The 2019 Nürnberger Versicherungscup was a professional tennis tournament played on outdoor clay courts. It was the 7th edition of the tournament, and part of the 2019 WTA Tour. It took place in Nuremberg, Germany, from 20 to 25 May 2019. It was the last edition of the tournament in Nuremberg.

Points and prize money

Prize money

Singles main draw entrants

Seeds

 Rankings are as of May 13, 2019.

Other entrants
The following players received wildcards into the singles main draw:
  Anna-Lena Friedsam
  Svetlana Kuznetsova
  Sabine Lisicki

The following players received entry from the qualifying draw:
  Çağla Büyükakçay
  Jana Čepelová 
  Quirine Lemoine
  Jule Niemeier
  Laura-Ioana Paar
  Nina Stojanović

Withdrawals
  Katie Boulter → replaced by  Paula Ormaechea
  Margarita Gasparyan → replaced by  Misaki Doi
  Julia Görges → replaced by  Kristýna Plíšková
  Polona Hercog → replaced by  Sorana Cîrstea
  Taylor Townsend → replaced by  Vitalia Diatchenko

Retirements
  Dalila Jakupović (viral illness)
  Vera Lapko (cramping)

Doubles main draw entrants

Seeds 

 1 Rankings as of May 13, 2019.

Other entrants 
The following pairs received wildcards into the doubles main draw:
  Katharina Gerlach /  Julia Wachaczyk 
  Katharina Hobgarski /  Jule Niemeier

The following pair received entry as alternates:
  Akgul Amanmuradova /  Valentina Ivakhnenko

Withdrawals 
Before the tournament
  Anna-Lena Grönefeld

Champions

Singles

  Yulia Putintseva def.  Tamara Zidanšek, 4–6, 6–4, 6–2

Doubles

  Gabriela Dabrowski /  Xu Yifan def.  Sharon Fichman /  Nicole Melichar 4–6, 7–6(7–5), [10–5]

References

External links 
 Official website  

2019 WTA Tour
2019
2019 in German tennis
Nürnberger Versicherungscup